Novoye is a rural locality (a village) in Staroselskoye Rural Settlement, Vologodsky District, Vologda Oblast, Russia. The population was 230 as of 2002.

Geography 
The distance to Vologda is 34 km, to Striznevo is 8 km. Filisovo is the nearest rural locality.

References 

Rural localities in Vologodsky District